Gourbeyrella is a genus of beetles in the family Cerambycidae, containing the following species:

 Gourbeyrella alexisi Chalumeau & Touroult, 2004
 Gourbeyrella madininae Chalumeau & Touroult, 2004
 Gourbeyrella romanowskii (Fleutiaux & Salle, 1889)

References

Tillomorphini